The United States Space Force's 5th Electromagnetic Warfare Squadron (5 EWS) is a space electromagnetic warfare unit located at Peterson Space Force Base, Colorado.

Mission 
The mission of the 5 SSS was to operate the Low Altitude Space Surveillance (LASS) system and Deep Space Tracking System (DSTS) to gather space intelligence and track space systems in both near- and far-Earth orbits.

History 
The dual LASS/DSTS operation supported USAF space intelligence requirements, while being assisted by the 18th Intelligence Squadron's Det 4 for SIGINT support.  This coverage augmented worldwide coverage of space signals activities at similarly equipped sites at Misawa AB, Japan, Osan AB, Republic of Korea and at Griffiss AFB in the United States.

The Deep Space Tracking System uses sensitive, highly accurate 20-foot dish antennas to detect and track S-band radio signals transmitted by radio beacons on most satellites.  There were DSTS receivers located at Griffiss AFB, New York; RAF Feltwell, Great Britain; and Misawa AB, Japan.

The 5 SSS was inactivated in 2003, with administration of RAF Feltwell transferred to Detachment 4, 18th Intelligence Squadron.

On 15 April 2022, the 5th Space Control Squadron was redesignated the 5th Electromagnetic Warfare Squadron.

Previous designations 
5th Space Control Squadron (2019–2022)
5th Space Surveillance Squadron (1989–2003)

Bases stationed 
RAF Feltwell, United Kingdom (1989–2003)

List of commanders 
Lt Col Alexander Courtney, June 2021 – Present
Lt Col Susan Bedell, 10 October 2019 – June 2021
Lt Col John W. Raymond, April 2000 – June 2001
Lt Col John Amrine, June 1999 – July 2000
Lt Col Steven R. Prebeck, 28 September 1996 – ???
Lt Col James L. Burling, Jr., August 1994 – 28 September 1996
Lt Col Ronald P. Mitchell, 1 October 1990 – ???

Equipment Operated 
Low Altitude Space Surveillance (LASS) (1989–2003)
Deep Space Tracking System (DSTS) (1989–2003)

See also 
1st Space Surveillance Squadron
3d Space Experimentation Squadron
18th Intelligence Squadron
21st Space Wing

Decorations 
Air Force Outstanding Unit Award 
1 January 2000 – 31 August 2001
1 January 1999 – 31 December 1999
1 January 1998 – 31 December 1998
1 October 1997 – 30 September 1999
1 October 1995 – 30 September 1997

References 

Squadrons of the United States Space Force